Voronina (Voroninsky) Nature Reserve is a strict ecological reserve (a zapovednik) located in the valley of the Vorona River (the right tributary of the Khopyor River), in the forest-steppe zone of southwest Russia. The Voroninsky Reserve protects riverine wetlands in the southeast of the Oka–Don Plain. The reserve is situated in Kirsanovsky and Inzhavinsky districts of Tambov Oblast, about 100 km southeast of the city of Tambov.

Topography
The Voronina Reserve has a terrain that is relatively flat river valley plain, with some spurs of the Central Uplands. The river valley, of glacial alluvial origin, is 2–6 km wide, and at the most 60–70 meters below the adjacent plateau. The average altitude is about 160 meters above sea level.  About 78% of the reserve is wooded, and the remainder is wetlands and open field. The reserve consists of two large protected areas along the river, and 10 smaller sectors spread around the center. The main central feature is the Vorona River, which flows at this point southeast to the Khopyor River and then to the Don.  The ground cover is "black soil", with the richest soil in the lowest levels.

The two main sectors are (Official Map):

 Inzhavinsky forest (4,990 ha).
 Kirsanovsky forest (5,330 ha).

Ecoregion and climate
Voronina is located in the East European forest steppe ecoregion, a transition zone between the broadleaf forests of the north and the grasslands to the south.. This ecoregion is characterized by a mosaic of forests, steppe, and riverine wetlands.

The climate of Voronina is Humid continental climate, warm summer (Köppen climate classification (Dfb)). This climate is characterized by large swings in temperature, both diurnally and seasonally, with mild summers and cold, snowy winters. The growing season is 182–185 days. Average precipitation is from 470 to 560 mm/year.

Flora and fauna 
The floodplain forests are dominated by 100–150 year old oak.  In these areas, under-story oak is almost non-existent now as the Norway maple and elm take their place.  The slope forests (on the right side of the Vorona) are generally narrow (under 1 km) and contain old-growth forests of oak, linden, maple and elm.  The meadow steppe areas of the floodplain are grasslands with extensive nettles at the top tier, and with scattered alder communities.  The alder forests have been historically affected by logging and agricultural use, but have been protected since 1964, and were the subject of reforestation around that time.  There are poplar and birch floral communities along the old riverbeds.

The animal life of the reserve is representative of the southern forest-steppe.

Ecoeducation and access
As a strict nature reserve, the Voronina Reserve is mostly closed to the general public, although scientists and those with 'environmental education' purposes can make arrangements with park management for visits.   There are 8 'ecotourist' routes in the reserve, however, that are open to the public; these require permits to be obtained in advance.  The main office is in the city of Inzhavino.

See also 
 List of Russian Nature Reserves (class 1a 'zapovedniks')
 National parks of Russia

References

External links

 Map of the Reserve (official website)
  Map of Voronina Reserve, OpenStreetMap
  Map of Voronina Reserve, ProtectedPlanet

1994 establishments in Russia
Geography of Tambov Oblast
Nature reserves in Russia
Protected areas established in 1994
Zapovednik